In economics, an infant industry is a new industry, which in its early stages experiences relative difficulty or is absolutely incapable in competing with established competitors abroad.

Governments are sometimes urged to support the development of infant industries, protecting home industries in their early stages, usually through subsidies or tariffs. Subsidies may be indirect, as in when import duties are imposed or some prohibition against the import of a raw or finished material is imposed. Economists argue that state support for infant industries is justified only if there are external benefits. That is underscored by the fact that the original bastions of the infant industry argument argued that external benefits aside, it is undeniable that both the US and Britain rose to become relative superpowers in economic terms by following their approach for an extended period of time.

Britain was one of the first nations to pursue such an approach in their early development with regard to their raw wool industry. Among other measures, the nation ensured that competition was not allowed to import into their market especially when the destined goods were of superior quality. After about 100 years of protectionism of this wool industry, the country finally decided that duties on exports would be lifted.

As for the US, in 1789 one of the first acts of the US Congress was to impose tariffs on a variety of imports including cotton, leather, and various forms of clothing, in an effort to protect the American textile industry.

Many mistakenly credit Friedrich List as the first individual to propose or set out an infant industry argument for the United States. Actually, it was Alexander Hamilton, the first Secretary of the Treasury who was the pioneer of the infant industry argument. Although List eventually accepted this argument, it did not come until his exile from the US. For further detail one should refer to the Reports of the Secretary of the Treasury on the Subject of Manufacturers (1791) regarding infant industries.

Basically, his arguments dictated that new or "infant" industries in the US could not become competitive with others in the international market unless the government offered them subsidies or allowances (often called bounties previously) at least for some initial time period. Hamilton specifically suggested that this aid could likewise be offered by stamping out competition through import duties or, in an extreme case, the banning of imported products of that type completely.

What began with Hamilton and was carried forward with others continued when Abraham Lincoln came into power in the US. Following the North's victory in the American Civil War, the US became the top follower of this approach until at least the time of World War I and, to a great extent, until World War II.

See also

Infant industry argument
Import substitution industrialization
Protectionism

References

Industrialisation
Protectionism